Hongshunli Subdistrict is a subdistrict located within Hebei District, Tianjin, China. It shares border with Xinkaihe and Tiedong Road Subdistricts in the northwest, Ningyuan Subdistrict in the northeast, Wanghailou Subdistrict in the southeast, Santiaoshi and Dahutong Subdistircts in the southwest. In the year 2010, its population was 94,411.

Its name Hongshunli can be literally translated as "Great Success Neighborhood".

Geography 
Hongshunli subdistrict is on the east of Hai River and southeast of Xinkai River. Waihuan East Road passes through the northeast of the subdistrict.

History

Administrative divisions 
The table below lists all the 11 residential communities under Hongshunli Subdistrict in 2021:

Landmarks 

 Tianjin Eye
 Temple of Great Compassion

Gallery

References 

Township-level divisions of Tianjin
Hebei District, Tianjin